Diceratura complicana is a species of moth of the family Tortricidae. It is found in Uganda. The habitat consists of forests.

The wingspan is 9–10 mm. The forewings are white with fuscous transverse striae. The costa is suffused with grey up to the middle. The hindwings are grey.

Etymology
The species name indicates the complicated structure of the valva of the species.

References

Endemic fauna of Uganda
Moths described in 2010
Cochylini